Norm Feuti (born May 14, 1970) is an American cartoonist best known for his nationally syndicated comic strips Retail and Gil.

Feuti grew up in Pascoag, Rhode Island, where he and his older sister were raised by their single mother, who worked in a screen windows factory. “Growing up in a single-parent family during America’s first ‘Great Recession’ wasn’t always easy, but I look back on my formative years fondly,” said Feuti. He drew in high school but wasn't impressed enough by his drawing ability to apply to an art school. He is a resident of Plainville, Massachusetts.

Retail

In Massachusetts, Feuti had over 15 years of retail management experience at seven different stores, selling everything from arts and crafts supplies, jewelry and men's footwear to clothing, giftware and toys. He first worked at a convenience store, recalling:

They insisted we wear an apron. Our clientele was generally getting out of a bar late at night, coming in, yelling that we were out of their brand of cigarettes, and we still had to put on an apron to create an air of respectability.

Next, he was employed at Father and Son Shoes, selling backpacks:
As the company moved into the backpack business, it asked employees to wear a backpack around the store and compete to sell the highest number. Customers mocked him, the bag proved uncomfortable and, in the end, he said, the only contest winner was the store's manager, who received a color television. Soon, he switched to Bostonian, an upscale shoe store where the merchandise was more expensive and the customers complained more loudly. One shopper called the store to report that a shoelace had broken off. It was unclear how the lace had broken, or what it had to do with the store, but the man angrily demanded that Mr. Feuti mail him a new one, which he did. After that, Mr. Feuti worked at Learningsmith, an educational toy and gift store, where, he recalled, he encountered parents who thought that their children were little geniuses in the making. When Mr. Feuti steered one mother to a series of Looney Tunes-themed workbooks she sneered that her highly literate children "never watch television."

Tapping into such past experiences, Feuti's daily comic strip Retail was launched on January 1, 2006 by King Features Syndicate.
Feuti ended Retail on February 23, 2020.

Gil

In 2008, Feuti created a second strip, Gil, as a web comic on his website. The main character is an eight-year-old boy named Gil who is raised by his single mother Cheryl in a poverty-stricken household. Gil also sees his father Frank occasionally, a ne'er-do-well who often offers Gil questionable advice. Secondary characters include Gil's friend and confidant Shandra and his antagonist Morgan. In 2011, Gil was picked up for syndication by King Features and launched in newspapers on January 2, 2012.

Living in Massachusetts in 2012, Feuti dreamed up Gil ideas while observing his children, along with memories of his own childhood experiences.

Books
Feuti's book Pretending You Care: The Retail Employee Handbook (Hyperion, 2007) is a manual for dealing with the problems of working in retail with Retail comic strips serving as illustrations.

Feuti's book The King of Kazoo (Graphix (an imprint of Scholastic) 2016) is a graphic novel for children aged 9 to 12.

References

External links
Norm Feuti Cartoons
The Gil Blog
Retail

1970 births
American cartoonists
Living people
People from Burrillville, Rhode Island
Artists from Rhode Island